The County of Rethel, promoted to Duchy of Rethel in 1581 and finally the Duchy of Mazarin after 1659, was a historic county in the French region of Ardennes. Its capital was the city of Rethel. The duchy was abolished due to the French Revolution in 1789.

History

Originally, the city belonged to the Abbey of Saint-Remi and was administered by its advocati. One of them, Manasses I, became the first Count of Rethel and he was the first member of the House of Rethel.

In 1481 the county, with Rethel as its seat, was elevated to the Peerage of France and, finally, in 1581, it was elevated to a duchy, the Duchy of Rethel.

In 1659, the last duke of the House of Gonzaga-Nevers, Charles of Gonzaga-Nevers, sold the duchy of Rethel to the Cardinal Mazarin, prime-minister of king Louis XIV and the country was, then, renamed as the Duchy of Mazarin, and the title was the Duke of Mazarin.

The last duchess Mazarin, Louise d'Aumont (1759-1826), married in 1771 Honoré IV Grimaldi, Prince of Monaco,

The French revolution abolished the duchy in 1789.

See also
Counts and Dukes of Rethel
Rethel

Notes

Sources
The counts of Rethel
The county of Rethel and his counts 

States and territories established in the 10th century
States and territories disestablished in 1789
County of Rethel